Steven Moore may refer to:

 Steven Moore (water skier), British former water skier
 Steven Moore (author) (born 1951), American author and literary critic
 Steven Dean Moore, American animation director
 Steven A. Moore, professor of architecture

See also
Steve Moore (disambiguation)
Stephen Moore (disambiguation)
Stevon Moore (born 1967), former American football player